The Opava Synagogue, or Templ, was a neo-Romanesque synagogue built in the Moorish style and designed by the prominent architect Jakob Gartner. It stood in the Silesian town of Opava between 1895 and 1938, when it was burned and levelled to the ground by the local fanaticized Sudeten Germans. It was one of the most distinctive structures of its kind in prewar Czechoslovakia. The name of the street where the tempel originally stood still bears the name “U synagogy”. The neighbouring rabbinical house, built in the same architectonical style, survived the Nazi rampage and is preserved until this day.

References

Former synagogues in the Czech Republic
Buildings and structures in Opava
Romanesque Revival synagogues
Moorish Revival synagogues
Synagogue buildings with domes
Synagogues destroyed by Nazi Germany
19th-century religious buildings and structures in the Czech Republic